Leptoctenopsis is a genus of moths in the family Geometridae erected by Warren in 1897.

References

Desmobathrinae